The 2018 Sydney International was a joint 2018 ATP World Tour and 2018 WTA Tour tennis tournament, played on outdoor hard courts in Sydney, New South Wales (NSW). It was the 126th edition of the tournament and took place at the NSW Tennis Centre in Sydney. It was held from 7 January through 13 January 2018 as part of the Australian Open Series in preparation for the first Grand Slam of the year. Venus Williams played the event for the first time in 17 years, 20 years after her maiden appearance.

Point distribution

Prize money

1Qualifiers prize money is also the Round of 32 prize money.
*per team

ATP singles main-draw entrants

Seeds 

1Ranking as of 1 January 2018.

Other entrants 
The following players received wildcards into the singles main draw:
  Alex Bolt
  John Millman
  Jordan Thompson

The following players received entry into the singles main draw as special exempts:
  Alex de Minaur
  Gilles Simon

The following players received entry from the qualifying draw:
  Evgeny Donskoy
  Daniil Medvedev
  Alexei Popyrin
  Aleksandar Vukic

The following player received entry as a lucky loser:
  Ričardas Berankis

Withdrawals
Before the tournament
  Filip Krajinović → replaced by  Ričardas Berankis
  Kei Nishikori → replaced by  Viktor Troicki

Retirements
  Damir Džumhur

ATP doubles main-draw entrants

Seeds 

1 Ranking as of 1 January 2018.

Other entrants 
The following pairs received wildcards into the doubles main draw:
  Alex Bolt /  Jordan Thompson
  Christopher O'Connell /  Matt Reid

Withdrawals
During the tournament
  Damir Džumhur

WTA singles main-draw entrants

Seeds 

1Ranking as of 1 January 2018.

Other entrants 
The following players received wildcards into the singles main draw:
  Garbiñe Muguruza
  Ellen Perez
  Olivia Rogowska
  Samantha Stosur

The following players received entry from the qualifying draw:
  Kristie Ahn
  Catherine Bellis
  Verónica Cepede Royg
  Camila Giorgi

The following players received entry as lucky losers:
  Lara Arruabarrena
  Carina Witthöft

Withdrawals
Before the tournament
  Julia Görges → replaced by  Carina Witthöft
  Anastasia Pavlyuchenkova → replaced by  Ekaterina Makarova
  Peng Shuai → replaced by  Lara Arruabarrena

During the tournament
  Garbiñe Muguruza

Retirements
  Mirjana Lučić-Baroni
  Kristina Mladenovic

WTA doubles main-draw entrants

Seeds 

1Ranking as of 1 January 2018.

Other entrants
The following team received entry as alternates:
  Lara Arruabarrena /  Lauren Davis

Withdrawals
Before the tournament
  Elena Vesnina

During the tournament
  Barbora Strýcová

Champions

Men's singles 

  Daniil Medvedev def.  Alex de Minaur, 1–6, 6–4, 7–5

Women's singles 

  Angelique Kerber def.  Ashleigh Barty, 6–4, 6–4

Men's doubles 

  Łukasz Kubot /  Marcelo Melo def.  Jan-Lennard Struff /  Viktor Troicki, 6–3, 6–4.

Women's doubles 

  Gabriela Dabrowski /  Xu Yifan def.  Latisha Chan /  Andrea Sestini Hlaváčková, 6–3, 6–1

References

External links 
 Official website

 
Sydney International, 2018